The 2021 Northwest Territories Men's Curling Championship, the men's territorial curling championship for the Northwest Territories, was held from January 30 to 31 at the Yellowknife Curling Centre in Yellowknife, Northwest Territories. The winning Greg Skauge rink will represent the Northwest Territories at the 2021 Tim Hortons Brier in Calgary, Alberta, and finished with a 2–6 record. The event was held in conjunction with the 2021 Northwest Territories Scotties Tournament of Hearts, the provincial women's championship.

Due to the COVID-19 pandemic in Canada, the reigning championship rink skipped by Jamie Koe could not commit to the quarantine process in order to compete at the national championship. Only two teams, clubmates Glen Hudy and Greg Skauge, entered the event. The event was played in a best of three series. Team Skauge won the event two games to one.

Teams
The teams are listed as follows:

Results
All draw times are listed in Mountain Standard Time (UTC−07:00).

Draw 1
Saturday, January 30, 10:00 am

Draw 2
Saturday, January 30, 4:30 pm

Draw 3
Sunday, January 31, 4:30 pm

References

External links
CurlingZone

Northwest Territories
Curling in the Northwest Territories
January 2021 sports events in Canada
2021 in the Northwest Territories
Sport in Yellowknife